The Devil's Mistress is a 2016 Czech–Slovak historical biography film directed by Filip Renc and produced by Jiří Jurtin. The film stars the Slovak actress Tatiana Pauhofová who plays Lída Baarová, the mistress of Nazi propaganda minister Joseph Goebbels. Lída Baarová was a star actress in Czechoslovakia, later moving to Germany to appear in the film Barcarole. There, she would be roped into the life of Joseph Goebbels and into the political lives of the Nazi Party elite.

Synopsis and summary 
The film largely centers around the experiences of Lída Baarová and her feelings regarding the moral dilemma of being romantically involved with a senior Nazi officer. Political and social turmoil within the early Nazi Germany are also shown, with the ending of the film featuring the events of Kristallnacht. Jewish persecution is also a feature of this film, but this is opposed by the colorful depictions of Nazi brass engaging in quaint social festivities. The film never shows crude depictions of the Holocaust, but instead shows the lighter side of the upper crust of Nazi Germany's officials. 

Inner politics of Nazi Germany is also shown, with interactions between Goebbels and Adolf Hitler showing Goebbels facing repercussions by the Fuhrer for his failings, while Lída Baarová is blacklisted from Nazi film. 

The family of Goebbels and the families of other Nazi Party members feature in this film, again adding to the personal aspect of the movie.

Cast 

 Tatiana Pauhofová as Lída Baarová
 Karl Markovics as Joseph Goebbels
 Gedeon Burkhard as Gustav Fröhlich
 Simona Stasová as Mrs. Babková, Lída's mother
 Martin Huba as Mr. Babka, Lída's father
 Pavel Kríz as Adolf Hitler
 Anna Fialová as a young Zorka, Lída's younger sister
 Zdenka Procházková as an older Lída Baarová
 Lenka Vlasáková as Magda Goebbels, the wife of Joseph Goebbels
 Jirí Mádl as Hans Fischer
 Matej Dadák as Milos Havel
 Jan Révai as Diether von Wedel

Nominations and reception 

The film, while doing quite well in the Czech Republic, did not do too well on the international market. The film received a 70% rating on Novinky.cz, a Czech movie review site.

References

External links 
 

2016 biographical drama films
Films about Nazis
Cultural depictions of Joseph Goebbels